Texas Rangers Ride Again is a 1940 American Western film directed by James P. Hogan, written by William R. Lipman and Horace McCoy, and starring Ellen Drew, John Howard, Akim Tamiroff, May Robson, Broderick Crawford, Charley Grapewin, and John Miljan. It was released on December 13, 1940, by Paramount Pictures. It was a sequel to The Texas Rangers.

Plot
Ellen Dangerfield returns to her grandparents' ranch in Texas after a 10-year absence when her widowed grandmother Cecilia Dangerfield loses 3000 head of cattle to rustlers. Fed up with her grandson Carter's unwillingness to track down the thieves, Cecilia appeals to her old beau, Ben Caldwalder, of the Texas Rangers, for help. To infiltrate the rustlers, Ranger Jim Kingston poses as an outlaw known as the Pecos Kid, and is hired by Joe Yuma, who owns the packing company. There, Jim learns that Joe has been slaughtering Dangerfield cattle and disposing their carcasses in a lime pit. With his partner, Mace Townsley, Jim sets out to learn who else is involved in the syndicate. When Palo Pete, one of Yuma's henchmen, tries to frame Jim for the murder of ranch hand Jake Porter, Ellen returns to her tomboyish ways and takes up her rifle to defend the ranch hands. That night, Yuma and his men slaughter more cattle on the ranch, and after dismantling their operation, take a convoy of trucks to the Portos Packing Company. Mace manages to send a message to the Rangers, and they apprehend Carter, who has been involved with the rustlers all along. Jim returns to the ranch to get Carter's address book when Yuma and his men attack the Dangerfield house. As Ellen, Jim, Ben, and Cecilia return the rustlers' fire, the Dangerfields' Mexican servant, Mio Pio, risks his life to get more ammunition. After the Rangers arrive to apprehend the rustlers, Jim and Ellen plan to wed and Ben orders Cecilia to marry him.

Cast 
Ellen Drew as Ellen 'Slats' Dangerfield
John Howard as Jim Kingston 
Akim Tamiroff as Mio Pio
May Robson as Cecilia Dangerfield
Broderick Crawford as Mace Townsley
Charley Grapewin as Ben Caldwalder
John Miljan as Carter Dangerfield
William Duncan as Capt. Inglis
Anthony Quinn as Joe Yuma
Harvey Stephens as Ranger Blair
Eva Puig as Maria
Harold Goodwin as Ranger Comstock
Edward Pawley as Palo Pete
Eddie Foy, Jr. as Mandolin
Joseph Crehan as Johnson
James Pierce as High Boots
Monte Blue as Pablo Slide Along

References

External links 
 

1940 films
American black-and-white films
1940s English-language films
Paramount Pictures films
American Western (genre) films
1940 Western (genre) films
Films directed by James Patrick Hogan
1940s American films